Tsagan-Morin (Sagaan Morin) is a rural locality (a selo) in Zakamensky District, Republic of Buryatia, Russia. The population was 524 as of 2010. There are 7 streets.

Geography 
Tsagan-Morin is located 72 km north of Zakamensk (the district's administrative centre) by road. Bortoy is the nearest rural locality.

References 

Rural localities in Zakamensky District